George Pile (8 July 1858 – 15 March 1948) was a Barbadian cricketer. He played in four first-class matches for the Barbados cricket team from 1883 to 1892.

See also
 List of Barbadian representative cricketers

References

External links
 

1858 births
1948 deaths
Barbadian cricketers
Barbados cricketers
People from Saint George, Barbados